African common toad may refer to:

 Amietophrynus regularis, the African bouncing toad, or common square-marked toad
 Amietophrynus gutturalis, the guttural toad